Burg-Reuland is a municipality located in the Belgian province of Liège. 
The name of the municipality refers to the castle "Burg-Reuland", which is located in the center of the community. On January 1, 2006, Burg-Reuland had a total population of 3,903. The total area is 108.96 km² which gives a population density of 36 inhabitants per km². Burg-Reuland is one of the municipalities of the German-speaking Community of Belgium.

The municipality consists of the following sub-municipalities: Reuland and Thommen.

The point where Belgium, Germany and Luxembourg meet is located on the river Our, near the village of Ouren in this municipality.

Sports
Burg-Reuland has two main football clubs: SG Rapid Oudler of Oudler village (matricule number 7432), who play in the Liège Provincial Leagues, and Racing Club Burg-Reuland, who play in local amateur leagues not affiliated to the Royal Belgian Football Association.

See also
 List of protected heritage sites in Burg-Reuland
 Reuland Castle
 Ouren Castle
 Haus von Orley

References

External links